Centar is the central municipality of the ten municipalities that compose the city of Skopje, the capital of North Macedonia. Centar is home to the Assembly of North Macedonia.

Geography

The Vardar River runs on the edge of the municipality along the border with Čair Municipality. Vodno Mountain overlooks Centar. The municipality's total area is 7.52 km2. 
Centar borders several other municipalities including: Karpoš Municipality to the west, Čair Municipality to the northeast, Aerodrom Municipality to the southeast, and Kisela Voda Municipality to the south.

Demographics

According to the last national census from 2002, the municipality has 45,412 inhabitants. Ethnic groups in the municipality include:
Macedonians = 38,778 (85.4%)
Serbs = 2,037 (4.5%)
Albanians = 1,465 (3.2%)
Roma = 974 (2.2%)
others.

Sports
The Toše Proeski Arena, the national football stadium, is located in the municipality and hosts home games of FK Vardar and FK Rabotnički.

References

External links

Official website

Municipalities of North Macedonia
Municipalities of Skopje